Porto Viro, or Taglio di Porto is a comune (municipality) in the Province of Rovigo in the Italian region Veneto, located about  south of Venice and about  east of Rovigo. It was first created during the Fascist era, but subsequently dissolved. It was established anew on 1 January 1995 by the merger of the communes of Donada and Contarina.

Porto Viro is the last major town on the Po, serving as regional riverine port before it enters the Adriatic.

Twin towns
  Veranópolis, Rio Grande do Sul, Brazil
  Mangalia, Romania

References

External links
 Official website

Cities and towns in Veneto